Mount Bendeleben is the highest peak in the Bendeleben Mountains of the Seward Peninsula in Nome Census Area, Alaska, United States.

The mountain was named in 1866 by members of the Western Union Telegraph exploring expedition for the leader of the expedition, Baron Otto von Bendeleben. A. H. Brooks, USGS, reported in 1921 the native name as "Ahneyiyuk," meaning "looks like a big one."

On a clear day, Bendeleben stands as a landmark, towering over all the mountains in its territory. It is possibly the most famous mountain on the peninsula, though by no means the highest.

References

Mountains of Alaska
Landforms of Nome Census Area, Alaska
Mountains of Unorganized Borough, Alaska
Landforms of the Seward Peninsula